Fatemeh Shams, also known as Shahrzad F. Shams (Persian: فاطمه شمس) is a contemporary Persian poet, literary scholar and translator, currently based in Philadelphia, Pennsylvania and teaching Persian literature at the University of Pennsylvania. She previously taught Persian literature and language at Oxford University, Courtauld Institute of Art, Somerset House, and School of Oriental and African Studies in London, UK.

Fatemeh Shams earned her doctorate from Oxford University in the year 2015 as a Clarendon Scholar in the field of Oriental Studies. Shams is well-known for her poems and writings on political and socio-literary issues in Iran. Her poems have been translated into English, German, Arabic, and Kurdish. Dick Davis, Armen Davoudian, Nabaz Goran, and Susan Bagheatani have translated her works into English, Kurdish, and German.

Fatemeh Shams was awarded as the best young Persian poet in 2012 by Jaleh Esfahani Poetry Foundation in London. She published her debut poetry collection, 88 in 2013. Her second collection was published in 2015 under the title of Writing in the Mist in London. Her third bilingual collection When They Broke Down the Door received Latifeh Yarshater award in 2016 for unique and groundbreaking developments in the form of Ghazal. Shams is currently a standing faculty member at the Department of Near Eastern Languages and Civilizations and a board member of the Middle East Centre at the University of Pennsylvania. Her groundbreaking monograph A Revolution in Rhyme: Poetic Co-Option Under Islamic Republic which has been published by Oxford University Press in 2021 is the first study of poetic legitimacy and the role of poetry and poetics in the political ideology of the Islamic Republic.''Early life
Born in 1983 in Mashhad, Shams started to write poetry at the age of 14 under the influence of poets such as Simin Behbahani, Mehdi Akhavan-Sales, Esmail Khoi. In 2000, she won the silver medal in the national olympiad of literature and a year later moved to Tehran to pursue her higher education in the field of Persian literature and then sociology at Tehran University. Fatemeh moved to London in 2006 and completed her degree in the field of Muslim Civilisation at Aga Khan University. She later moved to Oxford University, Oriental Institute to complete her doctorate in the field of Iranian studies where she also taught Persian language and literature and published her first poems in English. 

She has been a well-known female dissident poet. Since 2009 as a result of the controversial presidential election, she has been forced to live in exile following the arrest of her immediate family members (her sister and ex-husband) by the Iranian authorities. 

Shams publically renounced compulsory Hejab in 2011 which immediately made her a target of a state-sponsored online smear campaign . Ever since she has been an outspoken feminist activist against compulsory Hejab and anti-women laws in Iran and elsewhere. Womanhood, Life in exile, migration, politics, war, human relationships, gender issues, and socio-political taboos are among the leading themes in her works.

Career
Shams attended Tehran University to study sociology as an undergraduate. She migrated to England in 2006 to pursue her postgraduate studies at the Institute for the AKU-ISMC. After two years she joined Oxford University as a Clarendon Scholar. She graduated in 2015 with a DPhil in Oriental Studies. Broadly speaking, her research focus is the intersection of society, power, and literature. Her first monograph titled A Revolution in Rhyme: Poetic Co-option Under the Islamic Republic focuses on this topic. She is also written essays on the relationship of poetry and power  and the social history of Persian literature  in Iran. The history of cultural organizations in the post-revolution period as well as the role taken by the state in literary production have been amongst her main academic interests in the past few years.
 
Her poetry has received critical attention from renowned literary scholars including Ahmad Karimi Hakkak, who was the keynote speaker in her poetry book launch at the School of Oriental and African Studies (SOAS). In 2019 she was a contributor to A New Divan: A Lyrical Dialogue Between East and West.

Poetry reading
 Book Launch (88''), Poems by Fatemeh Shams, SOAS, London, September 2013 
Poetry reading at SOAS in 2013
Kelly Writers House in March, 2017

See also
 Iranian Studies
 Persian literature
 List of Persian poets and authors

References

External links

Fatemeh Shams on Poetry Foundation Website
Fatemeh Shams Page on Middle East Center of University of Pennsylvania 
Fatemeh Shams on New Yorker
Fatemeh Shams on Jadaliyya
 Life and Legends Fatemeh Shams, Translated by Dick Davis
 In the anxious alleyways of Tehran by Reza Mohammadi, BBC Persian
 Forough Farrokhzad and her daughters: a commentary on Fatemeh Shams's poetry by Ahmad Karimi-Hakkak, Rooz Online
 A note on 88 poem collection by Masoud Behnoud
 Blogistan: women and blogging in Iran

Interviews on Woman, Life, Freedom Movement in Iran
Fatemeh Shams in Conversation with Christiane Amanpour 
Fatemeh Shams in Conversation with Brooke Gladstone 
Fatemeh Shams on Washington Post 
Fatemeh Shams on France24 English 
Fatemeh Shams on New Statesman 
Fatemeh Shams on ZDF

Interviews on Modern Persian Literature
Fatemeh Shams on Iranica Online 
Sadeq Hedayat: Iran's Misunderstood Modernist 
Overlooked No More: Forugh Farrokhzad: Iranian Poet Who Broke Barriers of Sex and Society 
Interview with Guardian on Forugh Farrokhzad 

1983 births
American poetry in immigrant languages
Persian-language poets
Living people
Aga Khan University alumni
Alumni of the University of Oxford
People from Mashhad